The Dharmaraja–Kingswood Cricket Encounter is the annual cricket match between two of the largest government-run national boys' schools in Kandy, Sri Lanka: Dharmaraja College and Kingswood College. It is the oldest cricket match series in the central province and 2nd oldest in Sri Lanka, having been played for  years. It is also known as the Battle of the Maroons, referring to the school colors of the two schools.

The first match was played in 1893, with the Dharmaraja team captained by the great educationist, Sir Don Baron Jayathilake, then-incumbent principal of Dharmaraja College, and the Kingswood team captained by A.E. Spencer. It was played at the Bogambara Stadium, which is no longer a cricket venue. This match, along with few subsequent matches, were not exclusively schoolboy matches, for even staff members from each school were included in the teams. The first all-schoolboy Big Match was played in 1899, with J.C. de Mel captaining Dharmaraja and T.B. Marshall captaining Kingswood. All big matches were played at the Asgiriya Stadium until 2010, since 2011, all big matches have been played at the Pallekele International Cricket Stadium.

Series summary
Currently, Dharmaraja leads with 33 wins against 19 by Kingswood, with 56 matches ending in a draw. Notably, all matches from 1981 to 2010 ended in a draw. The last time a decision was possible during the series was in 1980, when Dharmaraja defeated Kingswood by nine wickets under the captaincy of Janaka Mendis. Kingswood's last win was in 1957 under Maurice Fernando. On 26 March 2011, Dharmaraja College registered a seven wicket win under the captaincy of Hemal Munaweera at the Pallekale Cricket International stadium, ending nearly 30 years of indecisive matches.

Highlights

 1899 – The inaugural Kingswood vs Dharmaraja match for schoolboys only was played on July 1. Kingswood was captained by T. B. Marshall.
 1914 – A. Jayasundera took 8 wickets for 90 runs as Dharmaraja beat Kingswood by an innings and 17 runs.
 1916 – R. Burke took 8 wickets for 7 runs as Kingswood beat Dharmaraja by an innings and 24 runs.
 1918 – Dharmaraja were out for 190 runs by Kingswood.
 1943 – First century in the series, scored by R. L. Arthur Alwis of Dharmaraja College. The Rajan's skipper, T. B. Talwatte, was deprived of this honour as he was injured by the Kingswood pace bowler, M. T. Jaimon and Talwatte had to leave the field temporarily during which time Arthur completed his century. Later, Talwatte too completed his century. M. T. Jaimon took 5 wickets for 90 runs for Kingswood. The match was won by the Rajans by an innings and 152 runs. J. P. Jayasena captained Kingswood.
 1951 – Kingswood led by the left-hander Shelton R. S. Perera, scored an exciting win over Dharmaraja, having had to score ten runs in six balls and one run in two balls, which they did with a ball to spare. The winning stroke was hit by the captain himself.
 1952 – Chandra de Silva scored 158 for Dharmaraja in this match, played at Randles Hill. Asoka Perera scored 148 for Kingswood. The match ended in a draw. De Silva's 158 was the highest individual score in the series to that date.
 1956 – The highlight of the drawn encounter was the bowling feat of M. Nizar of Kingswood who took 6  wickets for 48 runs.
 1957 – Kingswood amassed 401 for 9 wickets with Maurice Fernando scoring 101 runs. Dharmaraja replied with 269 runs in the first innings.
 1958 – Kingswood defeated Dharmaraja by 10 wickets; this was the last time Kingswood defeated Dharmaraja. In this match Kingwood was captained by C. M. Fernando who was selected 'the School Boy Cricketer of the Year'. Dharmaraja was captained by D. D. T. Alwis. The Kingswood opening pair, considered the best among schools, was Maurice Fernando and Herly Jayasuriya. They put on an unbroken stand of 102 runs in the second innings enabling Kingswood to win. Herly scored a brisk 50 while Maurice scored 43 runs.
 1959 – C. Ratnavibushana scored 167 for Kingswood, surpassing the earlier record of 158 as the highest individual score.
 1960 – The match ended in a tie but Kingswood's principal, K. M. de Lanerolle, awarded the match to Dharmaraja having gone through the score book for better performance.
 1964 – The match was postponed due to rain. In the rescheduled game the Rajans were two runs short of victory when the stumps were drawn.
 1965 – The Jayasundera twins, Ananda and Upananda, played for Dharmaraja. Earlier Kingswood had twins.
 1967 – The Kingswood skipper Tissa Jayathilake batting well with Mohan Kodituwakku, declared the innings still short of 9 runs of a century, which would have earned him the distinction of scoring consecutive centuries having scored an unbeaten 100 in the 1966 match. Another feature of this match was the bowling of the left-arm spinner Sena Abeygunaratne, who took 8 wickets for 39 runs in the Dharmaraja 1st innings of 143 runs.
 1976 and 1977 – P. B. Wickremasuriya of Kingswood and Ajith Naranpanawe of Dharmaraja entered the record books by scoring centuries in both years thus becoming the only two players to score centuries in consecutive matches.
 1981 – Cricket Captain of Dharmaraja College Janaka Mendis registered an outright win over Kingswood College. Since then for 30 years there was no decision.
 1983 – Senaka Dissanayake scored a double century for Dharmaraja, the only double century in the series, which stands as the highest individual score for the series.
 2001 – First one day match played in colour outfits which Dharmaraja won under Anuradha Jayasundara.
 2011 – First match played in Pallekele International Cricket Stadium and the first school cricket match to be played at that stadium. Dharmaraja College won by 7 wickets under the captaincy of Hemal Munaweera putting an end to the 30 years of draws.
 2012 – Dharmaraja College won the 106th Battle of the Maroons by 7 wickets under the captaincy of Viraj Karaputugala.
 2013 – The 107th Battle of the Maroons encounter was held on 22-23 March 2013 at the Asgiriya International Grounds. The limited over match was played on 30 March 2013 at the same venue.

See also
List of Big Matches in Sri Lanka
Trinity–Antonian
Royal–Thomian

References

External links
 Dharmaraja College website
 Dharmaraja College Archives
 Muditha Wijekoon – opening batsman par excellence
 The Kingswood-Dharmaraja match of 1958
 Rajans field a strong team this year
 
 Theme Song – Big match song:- sanjula himala ft shajid salim

Dharmaraja College
Big Matches